Hull Prairie is an unincorporated community in Wood County, in the U.S. state of Ohio.

History
Hull Prairie was platted in 1861, and named for David Hull, the original owner of the town site. A post office called Hull Prairie was established in 1862, and remained in operation until 1905.

References

Unincorporated communities in Wood County, Ohio
Unincorporated communities in Ohio